Kishdatl is a rural locality (a selo) in Khindakhsky Selsoviet, Tlyaratinsky District, Republic of Dagestan, Russia. The population was 21 as of 2010.

Geography 
Kishdatl is located 32 km north of Tlyarata (the district's administrative centre) by road. Tanit is the nearest rural locality.

References 

Rural localities in Tlyaratinsky District